Plexus International is a global arts collective that was founded in 1982 in New York City. The group was known for their collaborative, experimental art events as well as their theory of "artist in the first person" as a way to create co-authorship within the collective.

In 1985, the collective held a three-hour long show, titled "The Artificial Time of the Purgatorio Show '85 New York", at a Lower East Side squat, CUANDO. The collective's later work tended toward digital art productions, and the group eventually moved to be based in Italy.

Selected publications

External links
 Collective website

References

International artist groups and collectives
Art in New York City
1982 establishments in the United States